In February 2016 20-year old Aydin Sevigin  was arrested, and in June 2016 convicted for plotting to carry out a bombing attack using a homemade pressure cooker bomb containing shrapnel. The plot was possibly ISIS-inspired.

Sevigin grew up in the upscale Stockholm suburb of Danderyd.

Surveillance footage from IKEA showed him purchasing a pressure cooker.  "Six bottles of acetone, a mobile phone, duct tape and bullets" were discovered in a police raid on his property.

In June 2015, a member of Sevigin's family called police to say that he had gone missing. Shortly thereafter Sevigin traveled to Turkey twice, both times he was deported by Turkish authorities on suspicion of intending to join ISIS in Syria.  He is known to have downloaded ISIS propaganda and bomb-making instructions.

He was sentenced to 5 years in prison.

See also
 2017 Stockholm truck attack
 2010 Stockholm bombings

References

2016 crimes in Sweden
Islamic terrorism in Sweden
Failed terrorist attempts in Europe
Plots and attacks using pressure cooker bombs
Terrorist incidents in Sweden in the 2010s
Terrorist incidents in Europe in 2016